Tidjan (also Romanized as Tīdjān; also known as Bīd Jān, Tūjūn, and Tūrjān) is a village in Cheshmeh Sar Rural District, in the Central District of Khansar County, Isfahan Province, Iran. At the 2006 census, its population was 515 people in 175 families.

References 

Populated places in Khansar County